WPDT (105.1 FM) is a radio station broadcasting an Urban Gospel format. Licensed to Coward, South Carolina, United States.  The station is currently owned by Peter Schiff, through licensee Community Broadcasters, LLC.

History
The station went on the air as WRHA on 1991-07-26.  On 1995-05-19, the station changed its call sign to the current WPDT.

References

External links

Radio stations established in 1996
Gospel radio stations in the United States
1996 establishments in South Carolina
PDT